Chief Nike Davies-Okundaye (born 1951), also known as Nike Okundaye, Nike Twins Seven Seven and Nike Olaniyi, is a Nigerian batik and adire textile designer. She is best known as an artist for her cloth work and embroidery pieces.

Early life
Nike Okundaye was born in 1951 in Ogidi, Kogi State, in North-Central Nigeria, and was brought up amidst the traditional weaving and dyeing as practised in her home town. Her parents and great grandmother were musicians and craftspeople, who specialized in the areas of cloth weaving, adire making, indigo dyeing and leather. She learned how to use the loom to produce cloth during the time she lived with her great grandmother Ibitola (“Red Woman”). She spent part of her early life in Osogbo, Western Nigeria, modern-day Osun State. Growing up in Osogbo, which is recognized as a major centre for art and culture in Nigeria, young Nike was exposed to the indigo dyeing and adire production that dominated her informal training.

Career
Over the past twenty years, Davies-Okundaye has given workshops on traditional Nigerian textiles to audiences in the United States and Europe. She had her first solo exhibition at the Goethe Institute, Lagos, in 1968. She is the founder and director of four art centres that offer free training to more than 150 young artists in visual, musical and performing arts, comprising more than 7,000 artworks.

Finding that the traditional methods of weaving and dyeing that had been her original inspiration were fading in Nigeria, Davies-Okundaye set about launching a revival of this aspect of Nigerian culture, building art centres offering free courses for young Nigerians to learn traditional arts and crafts. As art historian John Peffer states, "One thing shared by many of the latest generation of African artists in the diaspora - those who have been successful on the art circuit - is that their work critiques the very burden of representation that is also the condition of their visibility." In her view, the traditional art of Adire Eleko is only possible because of a specific Nigerian heritage of passing knowledge from one generation to the next. In a video interview published by Nubia Africa, Okundaye states that "school can only teach what they [art students] already know." According to a CNBC Africa interview, she trained more than 3,000 young Nigerians for free and she continues to help by funding many poor to establish their small businesses and art workshops in different parts of Nigeria.

Davies-Okundaye's adire and batik textiles use visual themes taken from Yoruba history and mythology, as well as visual themes inspired by her own life experiences and dreams. According to Kim Marie Vaz, folklore often intermingles with personal experiences to express disheartening subjects regarding female suffering. Folklore that Davies-Okundaye was exposed to through evening stories spoken by the village elder, addressing social issues centred on the female suffrage, in which Davies-Okundaye uses folklore figures to express her concerts on the female suffering through her batiks that portraying the goddess Osun (i.e. "Mother of Africa") communicating on ideologies and social norms placed females in constrained positions.

Davies-Okundaye strives to improve lives of disadvantaged women in Nigeria through art. She teaches the unique techniques of indigo cloth-dyeing (Adire) to rural women at her workshop in south-west Nigeria. She hopes to revive the centuries-old tradition and the lives of these women. Adire – that which is tied and dyed – is native to the Southwest region of Nigeria. The freehand dyeing is sometimes known as "Adire Eleko". "Adire" refers to indigo dye, and "Eleko" refers to the boiled cassava, lime, and alum-resist technique used to create patterns. There is a strong tendency to keep dyeing recipes and methods secret from inquisitive outsiders. Davies-Okundaye chooses to continuously reference adire patterns in her artwork because adire is a women's art, and was taught to her by her mother. Adire pattern motifs were traditionally handed down from mother to daughter, and the designs themselves virtually have not changed in form over time.

Davies-Okundaye was featured on CNN International's African Voices, which features Africa's most engaging personalities, exploring their lives and passions. Her painting is permanently displayed at the Smithsonian Museum as of 2012, and her work is also part of the collection of the Gallery of African Art and the British Library in London and at Johfrim Art and Design Studio. She holds the chieftaincy titles of the Yeye Oba of Ogidi-Ijumu and the Yeye Tasase of Oshogbo.

Davies-Okundaye was included in the 2019 show I Am… Contemporary Women Artists of Africa at the Smithsonian's National Museum of African Art in Washington, D C. In April of the same year, she was conferred with an Honorary Doctorate by Rhodes University during its annual graduation ceremonies.

Personal life
Nike Davies Okundaye is mother to two sons and four daughters. She was formerly married to fellow Nigerian artist prince Twins Seven Seven, of late memories, but that marriage ended in divorce. Her children from that marriage are son Olabayo Olaniyi, College of Santa Fe graduate, is also an artist. Her second son Foluso Olaniyi, and her firat daughter Oluwaseyi Awoyomi, a multifaceted artist. She later married David John Davies, and had her daughters Caroline and Allyson. Her current marriage is to Nigerian Ex Police commissioner, Reuben Okundaye, father to her last child Amen Okundaye. Davies-Okundaye has more than 150 students in Europe and America. She is also a philanthropist.

Published sources
A book about Nike was written by Kim Marie Vaz, The Woman with the Artistic Brush: A Life History of Yoruba Batik Artist Nike Okundaye.

Honours
Nike Davies-Okundaye is the recipient of honours from numerous esteemed cultural institutions. She has served on the UNESCO Committee of the Intangible Nigerian Heritage Project. She has been honoured as the CEPAN Foundation Art Icon of the year. Davies-Okundye has given workshops and lectures at universities world over.

See also

 Nike Art Gallery

References

Further reading

External links
Official website of Nike Art Centre

1954 births
Living people
20th-century Nigerian artists
20th-century women artists
21st-century Nigerian artists
21st-century women artists
Nigerian textile designers
Nigerian weavers
Nigerian women artists
Textile artists
Women textile artists
Yoruba women artists